The Schur–Zassenhaus theorem is a theorem in group theory which states that if  is a finite group, and  is a normal subgroup whose order is coprime to the order of the quotient group , then  is a semidirect product (or split extension) of  and .

The Schur–Zassenhaus theorem at least partially answers the question: "In a composition series, how can we classify groups with a certain set of composition factors?" The other part, which is where the composition factors do not have coprime orders, is tackled in extension theory.

History 

Zassenhaus pointed out that the Schur–Zassenhaus theorem for non-solvable groups would follow if all groups of odd order are solvable, which was later proved by Feit and Thompson. Ernst Witt showed that it would also follow from the Schreier conjecture (see  for Witt's unpublished 1937 note about this), but the Schreier conjecture has only been proved using the classification of finite simple groups, which is far harder than the Feit–Thompson theorem.

Examples
If we do not impose the coprime condition, the theorem is not true: consider for example the cyclic group  and its normal subgroup .

The non-triviality of the (additional) conjugacy conclusion can be illustrated with the Klein four-group  as the non-example.

The quaternion group has normal subgroups of order 4 and 2 but is not a [semi]direct product.

Proof

The existence of a complement to a normal Hall subgroup H of a finite group G can be proved in the following steps:
By induction on the order of G, we can assume that it is true for any smaller group.
If H is abelian, then the existence of a complement follows from the fact that the cohomology group H2(G/H,H) vanishes (as H and G/H have coprime orders) and the fact that all complements are conjugate follows from the vanishing of H1(G/H,H).
If H is solvable, it has a nontrivial abelian subgroup A that is characteristic in H and therefore normal in G. Applying the Schur–Zassenhaus theorem to G/A reduces the proof to the case when H=A is abelian which has been done in the previous step.
If the normalizer N=NG(P) of every p-Sylow subgroup P of H is equal to G, then H  is nilpotent, and in particular solvable, so the theorem follows by the previous step.
If the normalizer N=NG(P) of some p-Sylow subgroup P of H is smaller than G, then by induction the Schur–Zassenhaus theorem holds for N, and a complement of N∩H in N is a complement for H in G because G=NH.

References

 
 

 .   English translation:

Theorems in group theory